Damien Pignolet (born c. 1948) is an Australian chef who created the Josephine Pignolet Young Chef of the Year Award.
Pignolet was born in Melbourne, Victoria.  He is a second-generation Australian of French descent. He studied at the William Angliss College of Catering from 1966.

Early years and adversity
Pignolet has overcome adversity in his life. Going into hospital at the age of 5, he came out when he was eight, spending almost four years lying flat in a full-body cast because of a rare hip disease. Pignolet says the experience made him inward-looking and shy and couldn't play sport for years. "I was always the odd person out," he remembers. "I lived in a complete fantasy world." Pignolet found comfort in cooking and started out utilising Women's Weekly cookbooks but soon went to the local library and discovered the great chef, Escoffier.

In 1966 Pignolet began a four-year course in catering and hotel management at William Angliss College. His career began in catering and led to teaching and the administration of a Melbourne cooking school. Pignolet worked in hospital and institutional cooking in Melbourne and in 1979 he moved to Sydney and made his name working in the restaurant Pavilion in the Park in the Domain.  It was where, he met Josephine Carroll. Pignolet says of her "We just fell in love like that. Instantly. But she was an apprentice, I was the executive chef. We were just good friends. The next year, we changed that." Together they worked at Butlers then from 1981 he owned Claude's in Oxford Street in Woollahra and made it a 36-seat classically French restaurant; the restaurant received much acclaim.

On 21 December 1987, Pignolet was driving back from Canberra, with his wife Josephine, whom he had been married to for six and a half years, together with Chefs Anne Taylor and Ian McCullough. All three were asleep and, for a split second Pignolet fell asleep and struck head on with an oncoming car, killing its driver and Josephine and seriously injuring Taylor and McCullough. Pignolet suffered major jaw injuries which required a liquid diet for 12 weeks and damage to his hip needed surgery that kept him confined to home for three months.

Josephine Pignolet Young Chef of the Year Award

Josephine is remembered through the Josephine Pignolet Young Chef of the Year Award, which sends the most promising young chefs overseas. Winning the Josephine Pignolet Young Chef of the Year Award has been the stepping stone to a brilliant career for many chefs.  Previous winners include Mark Best, the head chef of Marque Restaurant, Damian Heads
of Milsons and now Pony, Dan Hong of Bodega, Daniel Puskas and James Parry of Oscillate Wildly, and Phil Wood, Executive Chef at Rockpool Est. 1989.

In 1992 Damien went into partnership with Ron White and purchased the Woollahra Hotel creating Bistro Moncur in Woollahara.

He has been recognised as a leader in his field within New South Wales.

He is the author of French, with photography by Earl Carter, published in 2005 by Lantern (Penguin Aus.).

Bistro Moncur

Bistro Moncur is a restaurant which is part of the Woollahra Hotel in Sydney, New South Wales, Australia. It opened in 1993. The main focus is modern Australian and French cuisine. Damien Pignolet is the executive chef.

Awards
 Restaurant & Catering Association Awards for Excellence Winner - 2003 and 2004 - Best Restaurant in a Pub
 Sydney Morning Herald Good Food Guide 2004 - Awarded Two Chef's Hats
 Sydney Morning Herald Good Food Guide 2005 - 2007 - Awarded Two Chef's Hats

References

External links 
 Woollahra Hotel official site
 Restaurant reviews, map and street view

Australian chefs
Living people
1948 births
Australian people of French descent
People from Melbourne
People from Sydney